Adam Abraham von Gaffron und Oberstradam (11 October 1665 – 11 May 1738) was a member of the Silesian ancient noble family, Gaffron.

Service in the Life Guards
In 1683, von Gaffron joined the Danish Life Guards.  Between 1689 and 1691, he accompanied the Hjaelpetropperne and Nederlanderne battalions to Ireland. He was wounded at the Battle of Steenkerke in 1692, and in the battle at Helsingborg in 1710.  In the 1713 campaign in North Germany he proved a brave and skilful commander. In 1717 he commanded reinforcements sent to Norway.  With the death of Charles XII of Sweden on 30 November 1718, he was directed to Röros to block the way for Army Corps under Lieutenant General Carl Gustaf Armfeldt on their retreat back to Sweden. In the summer of 1719 he became the Commander of the so-called "smaalenske 'Corps, which advanced into Swedish Bohuslan.

Promotions
 Second Lieutenant, 1690
 Lieutenant, 1692
 Kaptajnlöjtnant (Junior Captain) 1696
 Kaptajn (Captain) 1697
 Major of the Granaderkorps (Grenadier Corps)
 “Karakteriseret“ Colonel, 1706
 Colonel of the third Danish regiment of the Imperial Service (Austria), 1707
 Head of the Royal Danish Marine Corps, 1707 
 Commander of the Grenadier Corps, 1710
 Major-General, 1712
 Commander of Norway, 1719
 Commander of the Danish Nyborg Castle, 1720.

Post-military career
Gaffron formed a good relationship with the burghers of Nyborg and was appointed to Lieutenant General in 1734. In the same year he was appointed by Frederik IV King of Denmark to be Governor of the Danish Island Fyn.  He was awarded the  Danish collar of the order of Dannebrogen in 1730.

Family life
Gaffron married Christine Charlotte Trolle (1685–1760), daughter of the Minister of State Herluf Trolle of Snedinge. They had eight children of which two sons both became officers in the Danish service. One of his sons, Balle Marimilian, returned to Silesia after inheriting the Castle of Haltauf and  Kunern from his aunt.

He died in 1738 and was buried in Noble Chapel of the Vor Frue Church in Nyborg on 23 June 1738.

References 

 Genealogisches Handbuch des Adels, GHda 1978, Volume IV.
 Almanach de Gotha 1921, 1926 and 1940.
 C.A. Sapherson; "The Danish Army 1699-1715".
 Lars-Eric Höglund och Åke Sallnäs; "The Great Northern War 1700-1721, Uniforms and Colours",
 Georg Brochmann, Blaker og Sørum historielag, 2004 "Skansen og Stolen"
 Archiv – Personalhist. Tidskr. 2 R 1 Pag. 269. – Pont Atl. 6 Pag. 770). "Hist. Tidsskr. 3 R 6 Pag 461- Kopibog i kirke Ark. 1738."
 Nyborg, Denmark: Opl. Fra B.B – Prot. i Praste Ark. Fol. 143. – No 101 Fol. 243; No 145. Fol. 157 i Raadh.

Other links 
 http://www.ggo.se (The GGO Foundation, Gawron-Gaffron-Oberstradam)

1738 deaths
Noble families
1665 births
People from Nyborg